James Arthur Williams (December 11, 1930 – January 14, 1990) was an American antiques dealer and a historic preservationist based in Savannah, Georgia. He played an active role in the preservation of the Savannah Historic District for over 35 years.

Williams is the main character in the book Midnight in the Garden of Good and Evil, published four years after his death in 1990. After four trials for an alleged murder that occurred in his house in 1981, he was acquitted in 1989.

Life
James Arthur Williams was born in Gordon, Georgia, to Arthur Costlar and Blanche Brooks Williams. He later moved to Savannah, where he became a noted antiques dealer and historic preservationist. He was active in the preservation of the Savannah Historic District.

In 1955, at the age of 24, Williams bought and restored his first three buildings: the single-level houses located at 541, 543 and 545 East Congress Street. Over the following 35 years, he restored more than fifty homes in Savannah, as well as in the low country of Georgia and South Carolina. Notable Savannah houses he restored include the Odingsells House, the Merault House, the Hampton Lillibridge House, James Habersham's Pink House and the Armstrong House.

In 1969, Williams purchased Mercer House, which was originally built for General Hugh Mercer, great-grandfather of famed American songwriter Johnny Mercer. At the time of the purchase, the house had been vacant for almost a decade since its former occupants, the Shriners organization, had used the building for their Alee Temple. Over two years, Williams restored the house. After the restoration, it became his residence; he ran his antiques restoration business from the carriage house located behind the mansion.

In 1979, during the filming on Monterey Square of The Ordeal of Dr. Mudd, starring Dennis Weaver, Williams hung a flag of Nazi Germany outside of a window at Mercer House in an attempt to disrupt the shoot, after the film company declined to make a donation to the local humane society, as Williams had requested. The Congregation Mickve Israel, located across the square, complained to the city.

Arrest and trials

Williams was arrested on May 2, 1981, for the alleged murder of 21-year-old Danny Hansford, with whom he had been having a homosexual relationship, at Mercer House. At his arraignment his bond was set at $25,000, which he posted. After the subsequent four trials, a record in the state of Georgia, Williams was finally acquitted by a jury in Augusta in May 1989, eight years after his arrest.

Death
On January 14, 1990, eight months after his acquittal, Williams died unexpectedly in his home, at age 59, from pneumonia and heart failure. He was discovered by Doug Seyle, one of Williams' employees, who let himself in after receiving no response at the front door. Reportedly, Williams collapsed in his study, near where Hansford also fell. Other sources state he died in the foyer. Williams is buried next to his mother, who survived him by seven years, in Ramah Church Cemetery, Gordon, Georgia. Williams' father, who died six years before him, is buried in Danville, Georgia.

At the time of his death, Williams was restoring the mansion at 126 East Gaston Street, known today as Savannah College of Art and Design's Granite Hall, which he had purchased.Granite Hall – SCAD.edu The mansion appeared in the movie version of Midnight in the Garden as the venue for the Married Women's Card Club.

In popular culture

The book Midnight in the Garden of Good and Evil, about Hansford's murder and Williams' subsequent trial for the killing, was written by author John Berendt and published in 1994.  A New York Times Bestseller and finalist for the 1995 Pulitzer Prize in General Nonfiction, the book was adapted into a movie directed by Hollywood veteran Clint Eastwood in 1997. "Kevin Spacey played Jim Williams -- badly," Berendt said in a 2015 interview. "He didn't even come close. I had offered [Spacey] recordings so he could to listen to Jim Williams talking to me, regaling me with stories while sitting in his living room in Mercer House. [Spacey] said he'd already heard Williams on tape talking during one of his trials. But when I saw the movie, I was perplexed by the way Spacey portrayed Williams, because he did it as if he were asleep. He talked as if he were in a fog or sleepwalking. Then I realized what had happened, and I thought it was hilariously funny." Berendt believes Spacey listened to tapes of Williams during the third trial, when he had taken Valium.

References

Citations

Sources
Midnight in the Garden of Good and Evil
More than Mercer House: Savannah's Jim Williams and his Southern Houses
James Williams - National Register of Exonerations

External links
Mercer Williams House Museum site

1930 births
1990 deaths
American art dealers
Historical preservationists
Burials in Georgia (U.S. state)
LGBT people from Georgia (U.S. state)
People from Wilkinson County, Georgia
People from Savannah, Georgia
20th-century American LGBT people
People acquitted of murder